The 1957 Missouri Tigers football team was an American football team that represented the University of Missouri in the Big Seven Conference (Big 7) during the 1957 NCAA University Division football season. The team compiled a 5–4–1 record (3–3 against Big 7 opponents), finished in a tie for third place in the Big 7, and was outscored by its opponents by a combined total of 157 to 149. Frank Broyles was the head coach for the first and only season. The team played its home games at Memorial Stadium in Columbia, Missouri.

The team's statistical leaders included Hank Kuhlman with 554 rushing yards, 569 yards of total offense, and 48 points scored, Phil Snowden with 299 passing yards and 567 yards of total offense, and Charley James with 132 receiving yards.

Schedule

References

Missouri
Missouri Tigers football seasons
Missouri Tigers football